Black Law is a hill in the Manor Hills range, part of the Southern Uplands of Scotland. One of the more remote Donalds, it does not easily combine into a round with other hills in the area and requires traversing rough terrain to reach the top. Common ascents are as part of an extended Dun Rig Horseshoe to the north-east, from the south at the Megget Reservoir or, most easily, from the Manor Valley itself.

Subsidiary SMC Summits

References

Mountains and hills of the Southern Uplands
Mountains and hills of the Scottish Borders
Donald mountains